Vitus Bering (1681–1741) was a Danish explorer.

Vitus Bering may also refer to:
 Vitus Bering (1617–1675), Danish poet, historian and Supreme Court justice
 Vitus Bering (icebreaker), a Russian icebreaker

Bering, Vitus